Elton L. Daniel is a historian and Iranologist.

He received his doctorate from UT Austin in 1978, and from 1981-2011 he was a professor of Middle Eastern and Islamic History at the University of Hawaii. He retired in 2011. Daniel is the director of the Ehsan Yarshater Center for Iranian Studies at Columbia University and the editor-in-chief of Encyclopaedia Iranica. He has conducted research and traveled extensively in Iran, Turkey, Syria, Egypt, France, and the United Kingdom.

He has published many books and articles pertaining to the history of Iran, including a revised translation of Al-Ghazali's Alchemy of Happiness.

Works

He published several books as well as numerous article in the Encyclopaedia Iranica. His published monographs include the following:

 The Political and Social History of Khurasan under Abbasid Rule, 747-820, Bibliotheca Islamica (Minneapolis, MN), 1979.
 The History of Iran, Greenwood Press (Westport, CT), 2001.
 A Shi’ite Pilgrimage to Mecca (1885-1886), University of Texas Press (Austin, TX), 1990 (as editor and translator, with Hafez Farmayan).
 Society and Culture in Qajar Iran: Studies in Honor of Hafez Farmayan, Mazda Publishers (Costa Mesa, CA), 2002 (as editor).
 Culture and Customs of Iran, Greenwood Press (Westport, CT), 2006 (with Ali Akbar Mahdi).

References 

Living people
American Iranologists
University of Texas at Austin College of Liberal Arts alumni
University of Hawaiʻi faculty
21st-century American historians
American male non-fiction writers
Year of birth missing (living people)
21st-century American male writers